Daniele Persegani (born 29 October 1972 in Cremona) is an Italian cook and television personality.

Since 2020 he has been appearing on the program , presented by Antonella Clerici on Rai 1.

He was also the chef of the Italy national football team in the Football World Cup in Brazil in 2014.

References

External links 
Daniele Persegani

Living people
1972 births
Italian television personalities
Mass media people from Cremona